La Vie sexuelle des Belges 1950–78 is a 1994 Belgian comedy film and satire on Belgian provincialism that proved a major cinematic success in Belgium. It was the first film by now-famed Flemish provocateur and director Jan Bucquoy. The film is an adaptation of Bucquoy's comic strip La Vie Sexuelle Avec Mes Femmes and has many autobiographical elements, following his youth in the 1940s, 1950s until the late 1960s.

Plot
The film tells an autobiographical tale of a clueless young bumpkin, Jan, trying far from successfully to keep up with times failing equally at being a 1960s free-love youth or political activist and finally sinking into a mundane life.

Reception 
The film received the André Cavens Award for Best Film by the Belgian Film Critics Association (UCC).

 "The cinematography is an unusual blend of the surreal and the mundane, infused with a quirky comic style which flitters between self-mockery and farce.  Bucquoy's portrait of his own mother provides the film with its most enduring image, the possessive house-proud woman who casually quips when she notices her husband has died, "it isn't time", and repeatedly states when she finds a way to save money: "it's cheaper that way". If the film is an accurate reflection of the truth, Bucquoy must have had one Hell of an upbringing...".)

References

External links 
Transatlantic Films Brussels
IMDB entry
comments on the film
Channel 4
Moviemachine
Tribune de Bruxelles
Allmovie
Cinémotions

Belgian comedy films
Belgian coming-of-age films
1994 comedy films
1994 films
Films based on Belgian comics
Films set in Belgium
Films shot in Belgium
Films set in Brussels
Films shot in Brussels
Belgian satirical films
Films set in the 1940s
Films set in the 1950s
Films set in the 1960s
Films about sexuality
Films directed by Jan Bucquoy
1990s teen films
1990s satirical films
1990s French-language films
French-language Belgian films